A government in exile (abbreviated as GiE) is a political group that claims to be a country or semi-sovereign state's legitimate government, but is unable to exercise legal power and instead resides in a foreign country. Governments in exile usually plan to one day return to their native country and regain formal power. A government in exile differs from a rump state in the sense that a rump state controls at least part of its former territory. For example, during World War I, nearly all of Belgium was occupied by Germany, but Belgium and its allies held on to a small slice in the country's west. A government in exile, in contrast, has lost all its territory. However, in practice the difference might be minor; in the above example, the Belgian government at Sainte-Adresse was located in French territory and acted as a government in exile for most practical purposes.

The governments in exile tend to occur during wartime occupation or in the aftermath of a civil war, revolution, or military coup. For example, during German expansion and advance in World War II, some European governments sought refuge in the United Kingdom, rather than face destruction at the hands of Nazi Germany. On the other hand, the Provisional Government of Free India proclaimed by Netaji Subhas Chandra Bose sought to use support from the invading Japanese to gain control of the country from what it viewed as British occupiers, and in the final year of WWII, after Nazi Germany was driven out of France, it maintained the remnants of the Nazi-sympathizing Vichy government as a French government in exile at the Sigmaringen enclave.

A government in exile may also form from widespread belief in the illegitimacy of a ruling government. Due to the outbreak of the Syrian Civil War in 2011, for instance, the National Coalition for Syrian Revolutionary and Opposition Forces was formed by groups whose members sought to end the rule of the ruling Ba'ath Party.

The governments in exile may have little or no recognition from other states. The effectiveness of a government in exile depends primarily on the amount of support it receives, either from foreign governments or from the population of its own country. Some exiled governments come to develop into a formidable force, posing a serious challenge to the incumbent regime of the country, while others are maintained chiefly as a symbolic gesture.

The phenomenon of a government in exile predates the formal utilization of the term. In periods of monarchical government, exiled monarchs or dynasties sometimes set up exile courts, as the House of Stuart did when driven from their throne by Oliver Cromwell and again at the Glorious Revolution (see ). The House of Bourbon would be another example because it continued to be recognized by other countries at the time as the legitimate government of France after it was overthrown by the populace during the French Revolution. This continued to last through the rule of Napoleon Bonaparte and the Napoleonic Wars from 1803–04 to 1815. With the spread of constitutional monarchy, monarchical governments which were exiled started to include a prime minister, such as the Dutch government during World War II headed by Pieter Sjoerds Gerbrandy.

Activities 
International law recognizes that governments in exile may undertake many types of actions in the conduct of their daily affairs. These actions include:
 becoming a party to a bilateral or international treaty
 amending or revising its own constitution
 maintaining military forces
 retaining, or newly obtaining, diplomatic recognition from other states
 issuing identity cards
 allowing the formation of new political parties
 holding elections

In cases where a host country holds a large expatriate population from a government in exile's home country, or an ethnic population from that country, the government in exile might come to exercise some administrative functions within such a population. For example, the WWII Provisional Government of Free India had such authority among the ethnically Indian population of British Malaya, with the consent of the then Japanese military authorities.

Current governments in exile

Current governments regarded by some as a "government-in-exile" 
These governments once controlled all or most of their claimed territory, but continue to control a smaller part of it while also continuing to claim legitimate authority of the entire territory they once fully controlled.

Deposed governments of current states 
These governments in exile were founded by deposed governments or rulers who continue to claim legitimate authority of the state they once controlled.

Deposed governments of former states 
These governments in exile were founded by deposed governments or rulers who continue to claim legitimate authority of the state they once controlled but whose state no longer exists.

Deposed governments of subnational territories 
These governments in exile claim legitimacy of autonomous territories of another state and have been founded by deposed governments or rulers, who do not claim independence as a separate state.

Alternative governments of current states 
These governments have been founded in exile by political organisations and opposition parties, aspire to become actual governing authorities or claim to be legal successors to previously deposed governments, and have been founded as alternatives to incumbent governments.

Alternative separatist governments of current subnational territories 

These governments have been founded in exile by political organisations, opposition parties, and separatist movements, and desire to become the governing authorities of their territories as independent states, or claim to be the successor to previously deposed governments, and have been founded as alternatives to incumbent governments.

Exiled governments of non-self-governing or occupied territories 
These governments in exile are governments of non-self-governing or occupied territories. They claim legitimate authority over a territory they once controlled, or claim legitimacy of a post-decolonization authority. The claim may stem from an exiled group's election as a legitimate government.

The United Nations recognizes the right of self-determination for the population of these territories, including the possibility of establishing independent sovereign states.

From the Palestinian Declaration of Independence in 1988 in exile in Algiers by the Palestine Liberation Organization, it has effectively functioned as the government in exile of the Palestinian State. In 1994, however the PLO established the Palestinian National Authority interim territorial administration as result of the Oslo Accords signed by the PLO, Israel, the United States, and Russia. Between 1994 and 2013, the PNA functioned as an autonomy, thus while the government was seated in the West Bank it was not sovereign. In 2013, Palestine was upgraded to a non-member state status in the UN. All of the above founded an ambiguous situation, in which there are two distinct entities: The Palestinian Authority, exercising a severely limited amount of control on the ground and the State of Palestine, recognized by the United Nations and by numerous countries as a sovereign and independent state, but not able to exercise such sovereignty on the ground. Both are headed by the same person—, President Mahmoud Abbas—but are judicially distinct.

Past governments in exile

World War II 

Many countries established a government in exile after loss of sovereignty in connection with World War II.

Governments in London 
A large number of European governments-in-exile were set up in London.

Other exiled leaders in Britain in this time included King Zog of Albania and Emperor Haile Selassie of Ethiopia.

Occupied Denmark did not establish a government in exile, although there was an Association of Free Danes established in London. The government remained in Denmark and functioned with relative independence until August 1943 when it was dissolved, placing Denmark under full German occupation. Meanwhile, Iceland, Greenland and the Faroe Islands were occupied by the Allies and effectively separated from the Danish crown. (See British occupation of the Faroe Islands, Iceland during World War II, and History of Greenland during World War II.)

Governments-in-exile in Asia 
The Philippine Commonwealth (invaded 9 December 1941) established a government in exile, initially located in Australia and later in the United States. Earlier, in 1897, the Hong Kong Junta was established as a government in exile by the Philippine revolutionary Republic of Biak-na-Bato.

While formed long before World War II, the Provisional Government of the Republic of Korea continued in exile in China until the end of the war.

At the fall of Java, and the surrender by the Dutch on behalf of Allied forces on 8 March 1942, many Dutch-Indies officials (including Dr van Mook and Dr Charles van der Plas) managed to flee to Australia in March 1942, and on 23 December 1943, the Royal Government (Dutch) decreed an official Netherlands East Indies Government-in-exile, with Dr van Mook as Acting Governor General, on Australian soil until Dutch rule was restored in the Indies.

Axis-aligned governments in exile 
In the later stages of World War II, with the German Army increasingly pushed back and expelled from various countries, Axis-aligned groups from some countries set up "governments-in-exile" under the auspices of the Axis powers, in the remaining Axis territory - even though internationally recognized governments were in place in their home countries. The main purpose of these was to recruit and organize military units composed of their nationals in the host country.

Persian Gulf War 
Following the Ba'athist Iraqi invasion and occupation of Kuwait, during the Persian Gulf War, on 2 August 1990, Sheikh Jaber Al-Ahmad Al-Jaber Al-Sabah and senior members of his government fled to Saudi Arabia, where they set up a government-in-exile in Ta'if. The Kuwaiti government in exile was far more affluent than most other such governments, having full disposal of the very considerable Kuwaiti assets in western banks—of which it made use to conduct a massive propaganda campaign denouncing the Ba'athist Iraqi occupation and mobilizing public opinion in the Western world in favor of war with Ba'athist Iraq. In March 1991, following the defeat of Ba'athist Iraq at the hands of coalition forces in the Persian Gulf War, the Sheikh and his government were able to return to Kuwait.

Municipal councils in exile 
Following the Turkish Invasion of Cyprus in 1974 and the displacement of many Greek Cypriots from North Cyprus, displaced inhabitants of several towns set up what are in effect municipal councils in exile, headed by mayors in exile. The idea is the same as with a national government in exile – to assert a continuation of legitimate rule, even though having no control of the ground, and working towards restoration of such control. Meetings of the exiled Municipal Council of Lapithos took place in the homes of its members until the Exile Municipality was offered temporary offices at 37 Ammochostou Street, Nicosia. The current Exile Mayor of the town is Athos Eleftheriou. The same premises are shared with the Exile Municipal Council of Kythrea.

Also in the Famagusta District of Cyprus, the administration of the part retained by the Republic of Cyprus considers itself as a "District administration in exile", since the district's capital Famagusta had been under Turkish control since 1974.

Fictional governments in exile 
Works of alternate history as well as science fictional depictions of the future sometimes include fictional governments in exile.
 In Len Deighton's SS-GB, the UK is defeated in World War II and occupied by Germany. A British government in exile is formed, but finds it far from easy to secure international recognition. Specifically, Deighton refers to this government in exile needing to go to the US courts and wage a prolonged struggle against the London-based German-collaborating government, before securing possession of the British Embassy in Washington.
 In If Israel Lost the War by Robert Littell, Richard Z. Chesnoff and Edward Klein, Israel is defeated in the 1967 Six-Day War and its territory occupied by Arab armies. Thereupon, David Ben-Gurion and Golda Meir set up an Israeli government in exile in North America.
 Algis Budrys' The Falling Torch is set in a future time when Earth was conquered and occupied by extra-terrestrial humanoid invaders. Many years later, the Earth government in exile, located at a human colony planet orbiting Alpha Centauri, is holding a regular meeting in an atmosphere of dejection and futility – its hosts being indifferent to Earth's plight and unwilling to offer any real help. The exile prime minister is shown more involved with his successful career as the chef of a luxury hotel than with the seemingly non-existent hope of liberating Earth. This depiction might have drawn on the writer's actual experience as a member of the exile Lithuanian community in the 1950s US, at the time seeing little hope of shaking the Soviet hold of its homeland.
 In the Hearts of Iron IV mod, Kaiserreich (which involves a German victory in World War I), Britain and France set up governments-in-exile in Canada and French Africa, respectively, after their homelands fall to Anarcho-Syndicalism.

See also 
 Exclusive mandate
 Exilarch
 Transfer of the Portuguese court to Brazil
 Provisional government
 Shadow cabinet
 Unrepresented Nations and Peoples Organization

Lists 
 Lists of active separatist movements
 List of historical separatist movements
 List of historical unrecognized states and dependencies
 List of territorial disputes
 List of states with limited recognition
 United Nations list of non-self-governing territories

References

Further reading 

Exile organizations